The Roman Catholic Diocese of Girardot is a diocese located in the city of Girardot in the Ecclesiastical province of Bogotá in Colombia.

History
 29 May 1956: Established as Diocese of Girardot from the Metropolitan Archdiocese of Bogotá

Bishops

Ordinaries
Alfredo Rubio Diaz (1956.05.29 – 1961.02.12), appointed Bishop of Sonsón
Ciro Alfonso Gómez Serrano (1961.04.08 – 1972.07.24), appointed Coadjutor Bishop of Socorro y San Gil
Jesús María Coronado Caro, S.D.B. (1973.02.10 – 1981.07.30), appointed Bishop of Duitama
Rodrigo Escobar Aristizábal (1982.05.21 – 1987.09.17)
Jorge Ardila Serrano (1988.05.21 – 2001.06.15)
Héctor Julio López Hurtado, S.D.B. (2001.06.15 – 2018.07.11)
Jaime Muñoz Pedroza (2018.07.11 - present)

Other priests of this diocese who became bishops
Eulises González Sánchez, appointed Vicar Apostolic of San Andrés y Providencia in 2000
Ismael Rueda Sierra, appointed Auxiliary Bishop of Cartagena in 2000

See also
Roman Catholicism in Colombia

Sources

External links
 Catholic Hierarchy
 GCatholic.org

Roman Catholic dioceses in Colombia
Roman Catholic Ecclesiastical Province of Bogotá
Christian organizations established in 1956
Roman Catholic dioceses and prelatures established in the 20th century